The 1966 Tennessee Volunteers football team (variously "Tennessee", "UT" or the "Vols") represented the University of Tennessee in the 1966 NCAA University Division football season. Playing as a member of the Southeastern Conference (SEC), the team was led by head coach Doug Dickey, in his third year, and played their home games at Neyland Stadium in Knoxville, Tennessee. They finished the season with a record of eight wins and three losses (8–3 overall, 3–2 in the SEC) and a victory over Syracuse in the Gator Bowl.

Schedule

Personnel

Team players drafted into the NFL

References

Tennessee
Tennessee Volunteers football seasons
Gator Bowl champion seasons
Tennessee Volunteers football